SoCal Surf was an American soccer team from Carlsbad, California, that played in the Premier Development League.

History
North County Battalion was founded in 2015 and began their first season in the 2016 NPSL season at Del Norte High School Stadium. In 2017, the team moved to the USL Premier Development League and were renamed the SoCal Surf, playing at the Army and Navy Academy's Maffucci Field.

Year-by-year

Players

References

External links
 Official site

 
Soccer clubs in the Greater San Diego Area
2015 establishments in California
Association football clubs established in 2015
Association football clubs disestablished in 2018